Amman Bus Rapid Transit is a bus rapid transit transportation system in Amman, Jordan.

Construction work on the BRT system started in 2010, but was halted soon after amid feasibility concerns. Resuming in 2015, the first route of the BRT system was inaugurated in July 2021, and the second was inaugurated in August 2022. Another BRT route connecting Amman with Zarqa is also under construction and is expected to be operational by the end of 2023.

The BRT system in Amman runs on 2 routes: the first from Sweileh in northwest Amman to the Ras Al-Ain area next to downtown Amman, and the second from Sweileh to Mahatta terminal in eastern Amman. Both routes meet at the Sports City intersection.

Ticket price for both lines are currently at 0.55 Jordanian dinars (around $0.78), bought either online via the Amman Bus mobile application or as a rechargeable card in major terminals. Passengers scan their cards or QR codes on phone when boarding the bus, where the price ticket is subtracted from the available balance. The buses are air-conditioned, accessible, monitored with security cameras and have free internet service.

Background
Plans for a BRT system were first announced in 2009 and construction work started soon after in 2010. The BRT project was originally funded through a soft loan provided by the Agence Française de Développement for $166 million directly to the Greater Amman Municipality. Claims by the House of Representatives and the Audit Bureau that the project is unfeasible led the government to halt construction and hire a foreign consultant to review the scheme in 2011. Construction on the project did not resume until 2015, when the House approved its revival. The first route of the BRT system was inaugurated in July 2021, with the second route was inaugurated in August 2022. The BRT project was controversial among the Jordanian public, who criticized its institutional and constructional delays.

Sweileh-Jordan Museum Route
The first route of the BRT system was inaugurated on 27 July 2021, extending from the Sweileh terminal in northwestern Amman passes by Sports City Circle to the Jordan Museum terminal in Ras Al-Ain area next to the Jordan Museum and downtown Amman.

Sweileh-Mahatta Route
The second route of the BRT system was inaugurated on 4 August 2022, extending from the Sweileh terminal in northwestern Amman to the Mahatta terminal in eastern Amman.

Gallery

See also
 Amman Bus

References

External links
Official website

Amman